Dido Miles is an English actress. She is known for her role as Emma Reid on the BBC soap opera Doctors, for which she has won two awards for at the RTS Midlands Awards. From 2001 to 2002, she starred in the CBBC children's series Oscar Charlie. Recently credited for extra voices on Father Brown, without appearing.

Career
Miles trained at RADA and made her acting debut in an episode of the BBC anthology series Screenplay. Following this, she appeared in the 1994 film Black Beauty, and she later appeared in the 1995 film First Knight. Miles also starred in the 1996 film Emma as Isabella Knight. Following this, she went on to appear in series such as The Bill, Making Waves, and Dani's House. In May 2009, Miles portrayed the role of Viv Bates in three episodes of the BBC soap opera EastEnders. In October 2019, she reprised her role as Viv for one episode.

In 2012, Miles made her first appearance as Emma Reid in the BBC soap opera Doctors. Whilst on the series, her character's storylines have included dealing with her marriage breakdown, having a difficult relationship with her son as he goes toward criminality, almost killing her husband, medical malpractice, having a relationship with a married woman, suffering from depression and coming out as pansexual. For her portrayal of Emma, Miles has garnered several nominations at the British Soap Awards in categories including Best On-Screen Partnership with Ian Kelsey at the 2016 ceremony, and Best Dramatic Performance at the 2013 and 2017 ceremonies.

Filmography

Awards and nominations

References

External links
 

20th-century English actresses
21st-century English actresses
Actresses from London
Alumni of RADA
English film actresses
English soap opera actresses
English television actresses
Living people
Year of birth missing (living people)